Delia Catalina Ramirez (born June 2, 1983) is an American politician serving as U.S. representative from Illinois's 3rd congressional district since 2023.

She also served as a member of the Illinois House of Representatives for the 4th district from 2018 to 2023.

The 4th district includes the Chicago neighborhoods of East Humboldt Park, Hermosa, Bucktown, West Town, Ukrainian Village, East Village, and Logan Square. Ramirez was elected to the House in 2018 and reelected in 2020. She was the first Guatemalan American elected to the Illinois General Assembly.

In 2022, Ramirez was elected to the United States House of Representatives in Illinois's 3rd congressional district. After being sworn in in 2023, she became the first Latina to represent Illinois in Congress. Ramirez is also a member of The Squad.

Early life and education 
The daughter of immigrants from Guatemala, Ramirez was raised in Chicago's Humboldt Park neighborhood. She graduated from Sabin Magnet Elementary School and earned a Bachelor of Arts in justice studies from Northeastern Illinois University.

Early political and advocacy career 
Before entering elected office, Ramirez worked and held leadership roles in social service agencies, nonprofit advocacy organizations, and local community organizations. Notably, she was president of the Logan Square Neighborhood Association from 2005 to 2007, executive director of the homelessness-focused nonprofit Center for Changing Lives from 2004 to 2013, and president of the Latin United Community Housing Association (LUCHA) from 2016 to 2019.

In the 2018 Illinois House of Representatives election, she ran for the open 4th district seat to succeed incumbent Cynthia Soto. She identified stable housing and stable schools, reliable and responsible government, and public safety and justice reform as her primary issues of concern. She was part of a slate of Latino candidates backed by then-Cook County Commissioner and congressional candidate Chuy García. She was also endorsed by a number of local elected officials, labor unions, and progressive organizations, including U.S. Representative Luis Gutiérrez, aldermen Carlos Ramirez-Rosa and Roberto Maldonado, Chicago Teachers Union, Illinois AFL–CIO, SEIU Healthcare and Local 73, United Working Families, and Our Revolution Illinois. Ramirez won a four-way Democratic primary election on March 20 with 48% of the vote, and ran uncontested in the general election on November 6, 2018.

Illinois House of Representatives 
After the 2018 general election, retiring incumbent Cynthia Soto resigned effective December 18, 2018. Ramirez, the recent winner of the general election, was appointed by local Democratic leaders and sworn into office on December 21, 2018. After serving the remainder of the 100th General Assembly, she was sworn into the 101st General Assembly on January 9, 2019. She is a member of the Illinois House of Representatives Progressive Caucus.

Committees 
As of July 2, 2022, Ramirez is a member of the following committees:

 Adoption & Child Welfare Committee (HACW)
 Appropriations - Human Services Committee (HAPH)
 Elementary & Secondary Education: Administration, Licensing & Charter Schools (HELO)
 Executive Committee (HEXC)
 Housing Committee (SHOU)
 Judiciary - Criminal Committee (HJUC)
 Medicaid & Managed Care Subcommittee (HAPH-MEDI)

Tenure 
In October 2019, Ramirez was part of a group of Democratic state legislators who opposed Chicago mayor Lori Lightfoot's proposed plan for the use of a new real estate transfer tax, arguing that a portion of the funds from the new tax should be explicitly set aside to address homelessness and affordable housing. In early 2020, Ramirez chaired a task force in the state legislature focused on the condition of children of incarcerated people.

During the COVID-19 pandemic in 2020, Ramirez sponsored legislation to create a temporary moratorium on rent and mortgage payments and strengthen eviction moratoriums, but the bill was defeated after strong opposition from realtors. However, she was able to pressure lawmakers to increase the size of a relief fund for tenants and landlords in the 2021 budget bill passed during the pandemic by 90%. She also led a successful effort to include a provision that would provide Medicaid benefits to undocumented seniors in the budget bill. Ramirez had been pushing for such a provision since 2019, and its successful adoption made Illinois the first state to provide Medicaid regardless of immigration status.

In the 2021–22 session, Ramirez was named vice-chair of the newly created Housing Committee in the House, and introduced new legislation to address housing issues related to the COVID-19 pandemic. A version of this legislation passed and signed into law in May 2021 as the COVID-19 Emergency Housing Act, including provisions that created guidelines for administering $1 billion in federal funds for rent relief from the American Rescue Plan Act of 2021, automatically sealing evictions filed during the pandemic, extending a statewide eviction moratorium until May, and pausing judicial sales of possession until July.

U.S House of Representatives

Tenure

Syria 
In 2023, Ramirez was among 56 Democrats to vote in favor of H.Con.Res. 21 which directed President Joe Biden to remove U.S. troops from Syria within 180 days.

Elections

2022 

On December 7, 2021, Ramirez announced that she would run in the 2022 U.S. House election for Illinois's 3rd congressional district. The district is an open seat due to redistricting after the 2020 U.S. census. In the Democratic primary election, she won 66% of the vote, defeating Gilbert Villegas, a member of Chicago City Council, and Iymen Chehade, a professor and foreign policy advisor. The district's electorate is heavily Democratic, and as such as the Democratic nominee was widely expected to win the general election in November.

Ramirez defeated Republican nominee Justin Burau in the general election, receiving 67% of the vote.

Caucus memberships 

 Congressional Equality Caucus
 Congressional Progressive Caucus

Committee assignments 

 Committee on Veterans' Affairs
 Subcommittee on Disability Assistance and Memorial Affairs
 Subcommittee on Economic Opportunity
 Committee on Homeland Security Vice Ranking Member

Personal life 

In October 2020, Delia Ramirez married Boris Hernandez. Hernandez is a DACA recipient.

Ramirez is the first United Methodist Latina in Congress. She has said: "In this church, my parents have shown me and my siblings that being a Christian is much more than words and certainly much more than participating on Sundays. Being a Christian is a way of living, a way of treating people, and the way we show the light of God through our actions."

Electoral history

See also

List of Hispanic and Latino Americans in the United States Congress

References

External links

Congresswoman Delia Ramirez official U.S. House website
 Delia Ramirez for Congress campaign website
 

 Representative Delia C. Ramirez (D) at the Illinois General Assembly

|-

|-

1983 births
21st-century American politicians
21st-century American women politicians
American people of Guatemalan descent
American politicians of Guatemalan descent
American Methodists
American United Methodists
Democratic Party members of the Illinois House of Representatives
Democratic Party members of the United States House of Representatives from Illinois
Female members of the United States House of Representatives
Hispanic and Latino American members of the United States Congress
Hispanic and Latino American state legislators in Illinois
Hispanic and Latino American women in politics
Living people
Methodists from Illinois
Women state legislators in Illinois